Arrow Aircraft and Motor Corporation was an American aircraft manufacturer based in Havelock, Nebraska in the 1920s and 1930s. It built a variety of light sporting aircraft.

History
The Arrow Aircraft Corporation founded on 27 March 1926 in Havelock, Nebraska by John D. Moore, George E. Moore, and Frederick J. Platz. In 1928, the Patriot Manufacturing Company, a truck body producer, was purchased and merged into the new entity, Arrow Aircraft and Motors. It began experimenting with using Ford V8 engines in aircraft in 1934. However, by 1939 the company was bankrupt, a consequence of the effect of the Great Depression, and cost overruns with LeBlond engines. Despite a hope that the increase in defense manufacturing – including a contract with Boeing – might save the company, its assets were later sold at two sheriff's sales in 1940.

Aircraft

See also

 History of Lincoln, Nebraska

References

Notes

Bibliography

External links

  at Nebraska State Historical Society

Defunct aircraft manufacturers of the United States
Companies based in Nebraska
Defunct companies based in Nebraska
History of Lincoln, Nebraska
American companies established in 1925
American companies disestablished in 1939
Manufacturing companies established in 1925
Manufacturing companies disestablished in 1939
1925 establishments in Nebraska
1939 disestablishments in Nebraska